Alan Mathison Turing  (23 June 1912 – 7 June 1954) was an English mathematician, computer scientist, logician, cryptanalyst, philosopher, and theoretical biologist. Turing was highly influential in the development of theoretical computer science, providing a formalisation of the concepts of algorithm and computation with the Turing machine, which can be considered a model of a general-purpose computer. He is widely considered to be the father of theoretical computer science and artificial intelligence.

Born in Maida Vale, London, Turing was raised in southern England. He graduated at King's College, Cambridge, with a degree in mathematics. Whilst he was a fellow at Cambridge, he published a proof demonstrating that some purely mathematical yes–no questions can never be answered by computation and defined a Turing machine, and went on to prove that the halting problem for Turing machines is undecidable. In 1938, he obtained his PhD from the Department of Mathematics at Princeton University. During the Second World War, Turing worked for the Government Code and Cypher School (GC&CS) at Bletchley Park, Britain's codebreaking centre that produced Ultra intelligence. For a time he led Hut 8, the section that was responsible for German naval cryptanalysis. Here, he devised a number of techniques for speeding the breaking of German ciphers, including improvements to the pre-war Polish bomba method, an electromechanical machine that could find settings for the Enigma machine. Turing played a crucial role in cracking intercepted coded messages that enabled the Allies to defeat the Axis powers in many crucial engagements, including the Battle of the Atlantic.

After the war, Turing worked at the National Physical Laboratory, where he designed the Automatic Computing Engine (ACE), one of the first designs for a stored-program computer. In 1948, Turing joined Max Newman's Computing Machine Laboratory, at the Victoria University of Manchester, where he helped develop the Manchester computers and became interested in mathematical biology. He wrote a paper on the chemical basis of morphogenesis and predicted oscillating chemical reactions such as the Belousov–Zhabotinsky reaction, first observed in the 1960s. Despite these accomplishments, Turing was never fully recognised in Britain during his lifetime because much of his work was covered by the Official Secrets Act.

Turing was prosecuted in 1952 for homosexual acts. He accepted hormone treatment with DES, a procedure commonly referred to as chemical castration, as an alternative to prison. Turing died on 7 June 1954, 16 days before his 42nd birthday, from cyanide poisoning. An inquest determined his death as a suicide, but it has been noted that the known evidence is also consistent with accidental poisoning. 
Following a public campaign in 2009, the British prime minister Gordon Brown made an official public apology on behalf of the British government for "the appalling way [Turing] was treated". Queen Elizabeth II granted a posthumous pardon in 2013. The term "Alan Turing law" is now used informally to refer to a 2017 law in the United Kingdom that retroactively pardoned men cautioned or convicted under historical legislation that outlawed homosexual acts.

Turing has an extensive legacy with statues of him and many things named after him, including an annual award for computer science innovations. He appears on the current Bank of England £50 note, which was released on 23 June 2021, to coincide with his birthday. A 2019 BBC series, as voted by the audience, named him the greatest person of the 20th century.

Early life and education

Family
Turing was born in Maida Vale, London, while his father, Julius Mathison Turing (1873–1947), was on leave from his position with the Indian Civil Service (ICS) of the British Raj government at Chatrapur, then in the Madras Presidency and presently in Odisha state, in India. Turing's father was the son of a clergyman, the Rev. John Robert Turing, from a Scottish family of merchants that had been based in the Netherlands and included a baronet. Turing's mother, Julius's wife, was Ethel Sara Turing (1881–1976), daughter of Edward Waller Stoney, chief engineer of the Madras Railways. The Stoneys were a Protestant Anglo-Irish gentry family from both County Tipperary and County Longford, while Ethel herself had spent much of her childhood in County Clare. Julius and Ethel married on 1 October 1907 at Batholomew's church on Clyde Road, in Dublin. 

Julius's work with the ICS brought the family to British India, where his grandfather had been a general in the Bengal Army. However, both Julius and Ethel wanted their children to be brought up in Britain, so they moved to Maida Vale, London, where Alan Turing was born on 23 June 1912, as recorded by a blue plaque on the outside of the house of his birth, later the Colonnade Hotel. Turing had an elder brother, John (the father of Sir John Dermot Turing, 12th Baronet of the Turing baronets).

Turing's father's civil service commission was still active and during Turing's childhood years, his parents travelled between Hastings in the United Kingdom and India, leaving their two sons to stay with a retired Army couple. At Hastings, Turing stayed at Baston Lodge, Upper Maze Hill, St Leonards-on-Sea, now marked with a blue plaque. The plaque was unveiled on 23 June 2012, the centenary of Turing's birth.

Very early in life, Turing showed signs of the genius that he was later to display prominently. His parents purchased a house in Guildford in 1927, and Turing lived there during school holidays. The location is also marked with a blue plaque.

School
Turing's parents enrolled him at St Michael's, a primary school at 20 Charles Road, St Leonards-on-Sea, from the age of six to nine. The headmistress recognised his talent, noting that she has "...had clever boys and hardworking boys, but Alan is a genius".

Between January 1922 and 1926, Turing was educated at Hazelhurst Preparatory School, an independent school in the village of Frant in Sussex (now East Sussex). In 1926, at the age of 13, he went on to Sherborne School, a boarding independent school in the market town of Sherborne in Dorset, where he boarded at Westcott House. The first day of term coincided with the 1926 General Strike, in Britain, but Turing was so determined to attend that he rode his bicycle unaccompanied  from Southampton to Sherborne, stopping overnight at an inn.

Turing's natural inclination towards mathematics and science did not earn him respect from some of the teachers at Sherborne, whose definition of education placed more emphasis on the classics. His headmaster wrote to his parents: "I hope he will not fall between two stools. If he is to stay at public school, he must aim at becoming educated. If he is to be solely a Scientific Specialist, he is wasting his time at a public school". Despite this, Turing continued to show remarkable ability in the studies he loved, solving advanced problems in 1927 without having studied even elementary calculus. In 1928, aged 16, Turing encountered Albert Einstein's work; not only did he grasp it, but it is possible that he managed to deduce Einstein's questioning of Newton's laws of motion from a text in which this was never made explicit.

Christopher Morcom
At Sherborne, Turing formed a significant friendship with fellow pupil Christopher Collan Morcom (13 July 1911 – 13 February 1930), who has been described as Turing's "first love". Their relationship provided inspiration in Turing's future endeavours, but it was cut short by Morcom's death, in February 1930, from complications of bovine tuberculosis, contracted after drinking infected cow's milk some years previously.

The event caused Turing great sorrow. He coped with his grief by working that much harder on the topics of science and mathematics that he had shared with Morcom. In a letter to Morcom's mother, Frances Isobel Morcom (née Swan), Turing wrote:

Turing's relationship with Morcom's mother continued long after Morcom's death, with her sending gifts to Turing, and him sending letters, typically on Morcom's birthday. A day before the third anniversary of Morcom's death (13 February 1933), he wrote to Mrs. Morcom: 

Some have speculated that Morcom's death was the cause of Turing's atheism and materialism. Apparently, at this point in his life he still believed in such concepts as a spirit, independent of the body and surviving death. In a later letter, also written to Morcom's mother, Turing wrote:

University and work on computability
After Sherborne, Turing studied as an undergraduate from 1931 to 1934 at King's College, Cambridge, where he was awarded first-class honours in mathematics. In 1935, at the age of 22, he was elected a Fellow of King's College on the strength of a dissertation in which he proved a version of the central limit theorem. Unknown to Turing, this version of the theorem had already been proven, in 1922, by Jarl Waldemar Lindeberg. Despite this, the committee found Turing's methods original and so regarded the work worthy of consideration for the fellowship. Abram Besicovitch's report for the committee went so far as to say that if Turing's work had been published before Lindeberg's, it would have been "an important event in the mathematical literature of that year". 

In 1936, Turing published his paper "On Computable Numbers, with an Application to the Entscheidungsproblem". It was published in the Proceedings of the London Mathematical Society journal in two parts, the first on 30 November and the second on 23 December. In this paper, Turing reformulated Kurt Gödel's 1931 results on the limits of proof and computation, replacing Gödel's universal arithmetic-based formal language with the formal and simple hypothetical devices that became known as Turing machines. The Entscheidungsproblem (decision problem) was originally posed by German mathematician David Hilbert in 1928. Turing proved that his "universal computing machine" would be capable of performing any conceivable mathematical computation if it were representable as an algorithm. He went on to prove that there was no solution to the decision problem by first showing that the halting problem for Turing machines is undecidable: it is not possible to decide algorithmically whether a Turing machine will ever halt. This paper has been called "easily the most influential math paper in history".

Although Turing's proof was published shortly after Alonzo Church's equivalent proof using his lambda calculus, Turing's approach is considerably more accessible and intuitive than Church's. It also included a notion of a 'Universal Machine' (now known as a universal Turing machine), with the idea that such a machine could perform the tasks of any other computation machine (as indeed could Church's lambda calculus). According to the Church–Turing thesis, Turing machines and the lambda calculus are capable of computing anything that is computable. John von Neumann acknowledged that the central concept of the modern computer was due to Turing's paper. To this day, Turing machines are a central object of study in theory of computation.

From September 1936 to July 1938, Turing spent most of his time studying under Church at Princeton University, in the second year as a Jane Eliza Procter Visiting Fellow. In addition to his purely mathematical work, he studied cryptology and also built three of four stages of an electro-mechanical binary multiplier. In June 1938, he obtained his PhD from the Department of Mathematics at Princeton; his dissertation, Systems of Logic Based on Ordinals, introduced the concept of ordinal logic and the notion of relative computing, in which Turing machines are augmented with so-called oracles, allowing the study of problems that cannot be solved by Turing machines. John von Neumann wanted to hire him as his postdoctoral assistant, but he went back to the United Kingdom.

Career and research
When Turing returned to Cambridge, he attended lectures given in 1939 by Ludwig Wittgenstein about the foundations of mathematics. The lectures have been reconstructed verbatim, including interjections from Turing and other students, from students' notes. Turing and Wittgenstein argued and disagreed, with Turing defending formalism and Wittgenstein propounding his view that mathematics does not discover any absolute truths, but rather invents them.

Cryptanalysis
During the Second World War, Turing was a leading participant in the breaking of German ciphers at Bletchley Park. The historian and wartime codebreaker Asa Briggs has said, "You needed exceptional talent, you needed genius at Bletchley and Turing's was that genius."

From September 1938, Turing worked part-time with the Government Code and Cypher School (GC&CS), the British codebreaking organisation. He concentrated on cryptanalysis of the Enigma cipher machine used by Nazi Germany, together with Dilly Knox, a senior GC&CS codebreaker. Soon after the July 1939 meeting near Warsaw at which the Polish Cipher Bureau gave the British and French details of the wiring of Enigma machine's rotors and their method of decrypting Enigma machine's messages, Turing and Knox developed a broader solution. The Polish method relied on an insecure indicator procedure that the Germans were likely to change, which they in fact did in May 1940. Turing's approach was more general, using crib-based decryption for which he produced the functional specification of the bombe (an improvement on the Polish Bomba).

On 4 September 1939, the day after the UK declared war on Germany, Turing reported to Bletchley Park, the wartime station of GC&CS. Like all others who came to Bletchley, he was required to sign the Official Secrets Act, in which he agreed not to disclose anything about his work at Bletchley, with severe legal penalties for violating the Act.

Specifying the bombe was the first of five major cryptanalytical advances that Turing made during the war. The others were: deducing the indicator procedure used by the German navy; developing a statistical procedure dubbed Banburismus for making much more efficient use of the bombes; developing a procedure dubbed Turingery for working out the cam settings of the wheels of the Lorenz SZ 40/42 (Tunny) cipher machine and, towards the end of the war, the development of a portable secure voice scrambler at Hanslope Park that was codenamed Delilah.

By using statistical techniques to optimise the trial of different possibilities in the code breaking process, Turing made an innovative contribution to the subject. He wrote two papers discussing mathematical approaches, titled The Applications of Probability to Cryptography and Paper on Statistics of Repetitions, which were of such value to GC&CS and its successor GCHQ that they were not released to the UK National Archives until April 2012, shortly before the centenary of his birth. A GCHQ mathematician, "who identified himself only as Richard," said at the time that the fact that the contents had been restricted under the Official Secrets Act for some 70 years demonstrated their importance, and their relevance to post-war cryptanalysis: 

Turing had a reputation for eccentricity at Bletchley Park. He was known to his colleagues as "Prof" and his treatise on Enigma was known as the "Prof's Book". According to historian Ronald Lewin, Jack Good, a cryptanalyst who worked with Turing, said of his colleague:

Peter Hilton recounted his experience working with Turing in Hut 8 in his "Reminiscences of Bletchley Park" from A Century of Mathematics in America:

Hilton echoed similar thoughts in the Nova PBS documentary Decoding Nazi Secrets.

Turing tried out for the 1948 British Olympic team, but he was hampered by an injury. His tryout time for the marathon was only 11 minutes slower than British silver medallist Thomas Richards' Olympic race time of 2 hours 35 minutes. He was Walton Athletic Club's best runner, a fact discovered when he passed the group while running alone. When asked why he ran so hard in training he replied:

Due to the problems of counterfactual history, it is hard to estimate the precise effect Ultra intelligence had on the war. However, official war historian Harry Hinsley estimated that this work shortened the war in Europe by more than two years and saved over 14 million lives.

At the end of the war, a memo was sent to all those who had worked at Bletchley Park, reminding them that the code of silence dictated by the Official Secrets Act did not end with the war but would continue indefinitely. Thus, even though Turing was appointed an Officer of the Order of the British Empire (OBE) in 1946 by King George VI for his wartime services, his work remained secret for many years.

Bombe

Within weeks of arriving at Bletchley Park, Turing had specified an electromechanical machine called the bombe, which could break Enigma more effectively than the Polish bomba kryptologiczna, from which its name was derived. The bombe, with an enhancement suggested by mathematician Gordon Welchman, became one of the primary tools, and the major automated one, used to attack Enigma-enciphered messages.

The bombe searched for possible correct settings used for an Enigma message (i.e., rotor order, rotor settings and plugboard settings) using a suitable crib: a fragment of probable plaintext. For each possible setting of the rotors (which had on the order of 1019 states, or 1022 states for the four-rotor U-boat variant), the bombe performed a chain of logical deductions based on the crib, implemented electromechanically.

The bombe detected when a contradiction had occurred and ruled out that setting, moving on to the next. Most of the possible settings would cause contradictions and be discarded, leaving only a few to be investigated in detail. A contradiction would occur when an enciphered letter would be turned back into the same plaintext letter, which was impossible with the Enigma. The first bombe was installed on 18 March 1940.

Action This Day  

By late 1941, Turing and his fellow cryptanalysts Gordon Welchman, Hugh Alexander and Stuart Milner-Barry were frustrated. Building on the work of the Poles, they had set up a good working system for decrypting Enigma signals, but their limited staff and bombes meant they could not translate all the signals. In the summer, they had considerable success, and shipping losses had fallen to under 100,000 tons a month; however, they badly needed more resources to keep abreast of German adjustments. They had tried to get more people and fund more bombes through the proper channels, but had failed.

On 28 October they wrote directly to Winston Churchill explaining their difficulties, with Turing as the first named. They emphasised how small their need was compared with the vast expenditure of men and money by the forces and compared with the level of assistance they could offer to the forces. As Andrew Hodges, biographer of Turing, later wrote, "This letter had an electric effect." Churchill wrote a memo to General Ismay, which read: "ACTION THIS DAY. Make sure they have all they want on extreme priority and report to me that this has been done." On 18 November, the chief of the secret service reported that every possible measure was being taken. The cryptographers at Bletchley Park did not know of the Prime Minister's response, but as Milner-Barry recalled, "All that we did notice was that almost from that day the rough ways began miraculously to be made smooth." More than two hundred bombes were in operation by the end of the war.

Hut 8 and the naval Enigma
Turing decided to tackle the particularly difficult problem of German naval Enigma "because no one else was doing anything about it and I could have it to myself". In December 1939, Turing solved the essential part of the naval indicator system, which was more complex than the indicator systems used by the other services.

That same night, he also conceived of the idea of Banburismus, a sequential statistical technique (what Abraham Wald later called sequential analysis) to assist in breaking the naval Enigma, "though I was not sure that it would work in practice, and was not, in fact, sure until some days had actually broken". For this, he invented a measure of weight of evidence that he called the ban. Banburismus could rule out certain sequences of the Enigma rotors, substantially reducing the time needed to test settings on the bombes. Later this sequential process of accumulating sufficient weight of evidence using decibans (one tenth of a ban) was used in Cryptanalysis of the Lorenz cipher.

Turing travelled to the United States in November 1942 and worked with US Navy cryptanalysts on the naval Enigma and bombe construction in Washington; he also visited their Computing Machine Laboratory in Dayton, Ohio.

Turing's reaction to the American bombe design was far from enthusiastic:

During this trip, he also assisted at Bell Labs with the development of secure speech devices. He returned to Bletchley Park in March 1943. During his absence, Hugh Alexander had officially assumed the position of head of Hut 8, although Alexander had been de facto head for some time (Turing having little interest in the day-to-day running of the section). Turing became a general consultant for cryptanalysis at Bletchley Park.

Alexander wrote of Turing's contribution:

Turingery

In July 1942, Turing devised a technique termed Turingery (or jokingly Turingismus) for use against the Lorenz cipher messages produced by the Germans' new Geheimschreiber (secret writer) machine. This was a teleprinter rotor cipher attachment codenamed Tunny at Bletchley Park. Turingery was a method of wheel-breaking, i.e., a procedure for working out the cam settings of Tunny's wheels. He also introduced the Tunny team to Tommy Flowers who, under the guidance of Max Newman, went on to build the Colossus computer, the world's first programmable digital electronic computer, which replaced a simpler prior machine (the Heath Robinson), and whose superior speed allowed the statistical decryption techniques to be applied usefully to the messages. Some have mistakenly said that Turing was a key figure in the design of the Colossus computer. Turingery and the statistical approach of Banburismus undoubtedly fed into the thinking about cryptanalysis of the Lorenz cipher, but he was not directly involved in the Colossus development.

Delilah
Following his work at Bell Labs in the US, Turing pursued the idea of electronic enciphering of speech in the telephone system. In the latter part of the war, he moved to work for the Secret Service's Radio Security Service (later HMGCC) at Hanslope Park. At the park, he further developed his knowledge of electronics with the assistance of engineer Donald Bayley. Together they undertook the design and construction of a portable secure voice communications machine codenamed Delilah. The machine was intended for different applications, but it lacked the capability for use with long-distance radio transmissions. In any case, Delilah was completed too late to be used during the war. Though the system worked fully, with Turing demonstrating it to officials by encrypting and decrypting a recording of a Winston Churchill speech, Delilah was not adopted for use. Turing also consulted with Bell Labs on the development of SIGSALY, a secure voice system that was used in the later years of the war.

Early computers and the Turing test

Between 1945 and 1947, Turing lived in Hampton, London, while he worked on the design of the ACE (Automatic Computing Engine) at the National Physical Laboratory (NPL). He presented a paper on 19 February 1946, which was the first detailed design of a stored-program computer. Von Neumann's incomplete First Draft of a Report on the EDVAC had predated Turing's paper, but it was much less detailed and, according to John R. Womersley, Superintendent of the NPL Mathematics Division, it "contains a number of ideas which are Dr. Turing's own".

Although ACE was a feasible design, the effect of the Official Secrets Act surrounding the wartime work at Bletchley Park made it impossible for Turing to explain the basis of his analysis of how a computer installation involving human operators would work. This led to delays in starting the project and he became disillusioned. In late 1947 he returned to Cambridge for a sabbatical year during which he produced a seminal work on Intelligent Machinery that was not published in his lifetime. While he was at Cambridge, the Pilot ACE was being built in his absence. It executed its first program on 10 May 1950, and a number of later computers around the world owe much to it, including the English Electric DEUCE and the American Bendix G-15. The full version of Turing's ACE was not built until after his death.

According to the memoirs of the German computer pioneer Heinz Billing from the Max Planck Institute for Physics, published by Genscher, Düsseldorf, there was a meeting between Turing and Konrad Zuse. It took place in Göttingen in 1947. The interrogation had the form of a colloquium. Participants were Womersley, Turing, Porter from England and a few German researchers like Zuse, Walther, and Billing (for more details see Herbert Bruderer, Konrad Zuse und die Schweiz).

In 1948, Turing was appointed reader in the Mathematics Department at the Victoria University of Manchester. A year later, he became deputy director of the Computing Machine Laboratory, where he worked on software for one of the earliest stored-program computers—the Manchester Mark 1. Turing wrote the first version of the Programmer's Manual for this machine, and was recruited by Ferranti as a consultant in the development of their commercialised machine, the Ferranti Mark 1. He continued to be paid consultancy fees by Ferranti until his death. During this time, he continued to do more abstract work in mathematics, and in "Computing Machinery and Intelligence" (Mind, October 1950), Turing addressed the problem of artificial intelligence, and proposed an experiment that became known as the Turing test, an attempt to define a standard for a machine to be called "intelligent". The idea was that a computer could be said to "think" if a human interrogator could not tell it apart, through conversation, from a human being. In the paper, Turing suggested that rather than building a program to simulate the adult mind, it would be better to produce a simpler one to simulate a child's mind and then to subject it to a course of education. A reversed form of the Turing test is widely used on the Internet; the CAPTCHA test is intended to determine whether the user is a human or a computer.

In 1948, Turing, working with his former undergraduate colleague, D.G. Champernowne, began writing a chess program for a computer that did not yet exist. By 1950, the program was completed and dubbed the Turochamp. In 1952, he tried to implement it on a Ferranti Mark 1, but lacking enough power, the computer was unable to execute the program. Instead, Turing "ran" the program by flipping through the pages of the algorithm and carrying out its instructions on a chessboard, taking about half an hour per move. The game was recorded. According to Garry Kasparov, Turing's program "played a recognizable game of chess". The program lost to Turing's colleague Alick Glennie, although it is said that it won a game against Champernowne's wife,
Isabel.

His Turing test was a significant, characteristically provocative, and lasting contribution to the debate regarding artificial intelligence, which continues after more than half a century.

Pattern formation and mathematical biology

When Turing was 39 years old in 1951, he turned to mathematical biology, finally publishing his masterpiece "The Chemical Basis of Morphogenesis" in January 1952. He was interested in morphogenesis, the development of patterns and shapes in biological organisms. He suggested that a system of chemicals reacting with each other and diffusing across space, termed a reaction–diffusion system, could account for "the main phenomena of morphogenesis". He used systems of partial differential equations to model catalytic chemical reactions. For example, if a catalyst A is required for a certain chemical reaction to take place, and if the reaction produced more of the catalyst A, then we say that the reaction is autocatalytic, and there is positive feedback that can be modelled by nonlinear differential equations. Turing discovered that patterns could be created if the chemical reaction not only produced catalyst A, but also produced an inhibitor B that slowed down the production of A. If A and B then diffused through the container at different rates, then you could have some regions where A dominated and some where B did. To calculate the extent of this, Turing would have needed a powerful computer, but these were not so freely available in 1951, so he had to use linear approximations to solve the equations by hand. These calculations gave the right qualitative results, and produced, for example, a uniform mixture that oddly enough had regularly spaced fixed red spots. The Russian biochemist Boris Belousov had performed experiments with similar results, but could not get his papers published because of the contemporary prejudice that any such thing violated the second law of thermodynamics. Belousov was not aware of Turing's paper in the Philosophical Transactions of the Royal Society.

Although published before the structure and role of DNA was understood, Turing's work on morphogenesis remains relevant today and is considered a seminal piece of work in mathematical biology. One of the early applications of Turing's paper was the work by James Murray explaining spots and stripes on the fur of cats, large and small. Further research in the area suggests that Turing's work can partially explain the growth of "feathers, hair follicles, the branching pattern of lungs, and even the left-right asymmetry that puts the heart on the left side of the chest". In 2012, Sheth, et al. found that in mice, removal of Hox genes causes an increase in the number of digits without an increase in the overall size of the limb, suggesting that Hox genes control digit formation by tuning the wavelength of a Turing-type mechanism. Later papers were not available until Collected Works of A. M. Turing was published in 1992.

Personal life

Engagement
In 1941, Turing proposed marriage to Hut 8 colleague Joan Clarke, a fellow mathematician and cryptanalyst, but their engagement was short-lived. After admitting his homosexuality to his fiancée, who was reportedly "unfazed" by the revelation, Turing decided that he could not go through with the marriage.

Homosexuality and indecency conviction
In January 1952, Turing was 39 when he started a relationship with Arnold Murray, a 19-year-old unemployed man. Just before Christmas, Turing was walking along Manchester's Oxford Road when he met Murray just outside the Regal Cinema and invited him to lunch. On 23 January, Turing's house was burgled. Murray told Turing that he and the burglar were acquainted, and Turing reported the crime to the police. During the investigation, he acknowledged a sexual relationship with Murray. Homosexual acts were criminal offences in the United Kingdom at that time, and both men were charged with "gross indecency" under Section 11 of the Criminal Law Amendment Act 1885. Initial committal proceedings for the trial were held on 27 February during which Turing's solicitor "reserved his defence", i.e., did not argue or provide evidence against the allegations.

Turing was later convinced by the advice of his brother and his own solicitor, and he entered a plea of guilty. The case, Regina v. Turing and Murray, was brought to trial on 31 March 1952. Turing was convicted and given a choice between imprisonment and probation. His probation would be conditional on his agreement to undergo hormonal physical changes designed to reduce libido, known as "chemical castration". He accepted the option of injections of what was then called stilboestrol (now known as diethylstilbestrol or DES), a synthetic oestrogen; this feminization of his body was continued for the course of one year. The treatment rendered Turing impotent and caused breast tissue to form, fulfilling in the literal sense Turing's prediction that "no doubt I shall emerge from it all a different man, but quite who I've not found out". Murray was given a conditional discharge.

Turing's conviction led to the removal of his security clearance and barred him from continuing with his cryptographic consultancy for the Government Communications Headquarters (GCHQ), the British signals intelligence agency that had evolved from GC&CS in 1946, though he kept his academic job. He was denied entry into the United States after his conviction in 1952, but was free to visit other European countries.

Treasure
In the 1940s, Turing became worried about losing his savings in the event of a German invasion. In order to protect it, he bought two silver bars weighing  and worth £250 (in 2022, £8,000 adjusted for inflation, £48,000 at spot price) and buried them in a wood near Bletchley Park. Upon returning to dig them up, Turing found that he was unable to break his own code describing where exactly he had hidden them. This, along with the fact that the area had been renovated, meant that he never regained the silver.

Death

On 8 June 1954, at his house at 43 Adlington Road, Wilmslow, Turing's housekeeper found him dead. He had died the previous day at the age of 41. Cyanide poisoning was established as the cause of death. When his body was discovered, an apple lay half-eaten beside his bed, and although the apple was not tested for cyanide, it was speculated that this was the means by which Turing had consumed a fatal dose. An inquest determined that he had committed suicide. Andrew Hodges and another biographer, David Leavitt, have both speculated that Turing was re-enacting a scene from the Walt Disney film Snow White and the Seven Dwarfs (1937), his favourite fairy tale. Both men noted that (in Leavitt's words) he took "an especially keen pleasure in the scene where the Wicked Queen immerses her apple in the poisonous brew". Turing's remains were cremated at Woking Crematorium on 12 June 1954, and his ashes were scattered in the gardens of the crematorium, just as his father's had been.

Philosopher Jack Copeland has questioned various aspects of the coroner's historical verdict. He suggested an alternative explanation for the cause of Turing's death: the accidental inhalation of cyanide fumes from an apparatus used to electroplate gold onto spoons. The potassium cyanide was used to dissolve the gold. Turing had such an apparatus set up in his tiny spare room. Copeland noted that the autopsy findings were more consistent with inhalation than with ingestion of the poison. Turing also habitually ate an apple before going to bed, and it was not unusual for the apple to be discarded half-eaten. Furthermore, Turing had reportedly borne his legal setbacks and hormone treatment (which had been discontinued a year previously) "with good humour" and had shown no sign of despondency before his death. He even set down a list of tasks that he intended to complete upon returning to his office after the holiday weekend. Turing's mother believed that the ingestion was accidental, resulting from her son's careless storage of laboratory chemicals. Biographer Andrew Hodges theorised that Turing deliberately left the nature of his death ambiguous in order to shield his mother from the knowledge that he had killed himself.

It has been suggested that Turing's belief in fortune-telling may have caused his depressed mood. As a youth, Turing had been told by a fortune-teller that he would be a genius. In mid-May 1954, shortly before his death, Turing again decided to consult a fortune-teller during a day-trip to St Annes-on-Sea with the Greenbaum family. According to the Greenbaums' daughter, Barbara:

Government apology and pardon

In August 2009, British programmer John Graham-Cumming started a petition urging the British government to apologise for Turing's prosecution as a homosexual. The petition received more than 30,000 signatures. The prime minister, Gordon Brown, acknowledged the petition, releasing a statement on 10 September 2009 apologising and describing the treatment of Turing as "appalling":

In December 2011, William Jones and his member of Parliament, John Leech, created an e-petition requesting that the British government pardon Turing for his conviction of "gross indecency":

The petition gathered over 37,000 signatures, and was submitted to Parliament by the Manchester MP John Leech but the request was discouraged by Justice Minister Lord McNally, who said:

John Leech, the MP for Manchester Withington (2005–15), submitted several bills to Parliament and led a high-profile campaign to secure the pardon. Leech made the case in the House of Commons that Turing's contribution to the war made him a national hero and that it was "ultimately just embarrassing" that the conviction still stood. Leech continued to take the bill through Parliament and campaigned for several years, gaining the public support of numerous leading scientists, including Stephen Hawking. At the British premiere of a film based on Turing's life, The Imitation Game, the producers thanked Leech for bringing the topic to public attention and securing Turing's pardon. Leech is now regularly described as the "architect" of Turing's pardon and subsequently the Alan Turing Law which went on to secure pardons for 75,000 other men and women convicted of similar crimes.

On 26 July 2012, a bill was introduced in the House of Lords to grant a statutory pardon to Turing for offences under section 11 of the Criminal Law Amendment Act 1885, of which he was convicted on 31 March 1952. Late in the year in a letter to The Daily Telegraph, the physicist Stephen Hawking and 10 other signatories including the Astronomer Royal Lord Rees, President of the Royal Society Sir Paul Nurse, Lady Trumpington (who worked for Turing during the war) and Lord Sharkey (the bill's sponsor) called on Prime Minister David Cameron to act on the pardon request. The government indicated it would support the bill, and it passed its third reading in the House of Lords in October.

At the bill's second reading in the House of Commons on 29 November 2013, Conservative MP Christopher Chope objected to the bill, delaying its passage. The bill was due to return to the House of Commons on 28 February 2014, but before the bill could be debated in the House of Commons, the government elected to proceed under the royal prerogative of mercy. On 24 December 2013, Queen Elizabeth II signed a pardon for Turing's conviction for "gross indecency", with immediate effect. Announcing the pardon, Lord Chancellor Chris Grayling said Turing deserved to be "remembered and recognised for his fantastic contribution to the war effort" and not for his later criminal conviction. The Queen officially pronounced Turing pardoned in August 2014. The Queen's action is only the fourth royal pardon granted since the conclusion of the Second World War. Pardons are normally granted only when the person is technically innocent, and a request has been made by the family or other interested party; neither condition was met in regard to Turing's conviction.

In September 2016, the government announced its intention to expand this retroactive exoneration to other men convicted of similar historical indecency offences, in what was described as an "Alan Turing law". The Alan Turing law is now an informal term for the law in the United Kingdom, contained in the Policing and Crime Act 2017, which serves as an amnesty law to retroactively pardon men who were cautioned or convicted under historical legislation that outlawed homosexual acts. The law applies in England and Wales.

Legacy

Awards, honours, and tributes

Turing was appointed an officer of the Order of the British Empire in 1946. He was also elected a Fellow of the Royal Society (FRS) in 1951.

Turing has been honoured in various ways in Manchester, the city where he worked towards the end of his life. In 1994, a stretch of the A6010 road (the Manchester city intermediate ring road) was named "Alan Turing Way". A bridge carrying this road was widened, and carries the name Alan Turing Bridge. A statue of Turing was unveiled in Manchester on 23 June 2001 in Sackville Park, between the University of Manchester building on Whitworth Street and Canal Street. The memorial statue depicts the "father of computer science" sitting on a bench at a central position in the park, holding an apple. The cast bronze bench carries in relief the text "Alan Mathison Turing 1912–1954" and "IEKYF ROMSI ADXUO KVKZC GUBJ". The latter is described by the sculptor, Glyn Hughes, as "a motto as encoded by the German 'Enigma'". The original message is often given as "Founder of Computer Science", however this is unlikely as the Enigma ciphering system does not allow a letter to be enciphered to itself, while the fourteenth letter of that message (the "U" in "Computer") is the same as the fourteenth letter of the encoded inscription. A plaque at the statue's feet reads "Father of Computer Science, Mathematician, Logician, Wartime Codebreaker, Victim of Prejudice", followed by a Bertrand Russell quotation: "Mathematics, rightly viewed, possesses not only truth but supreme beauty, a beauty cold and austere like that of sculpture." The sculptor's own old Amstrad computer is buried under the statue as a tribute to "the godfather of all modern computer".

In 1999, Time magazine named Turing as one of the 100 Most Important People of the 20th century and stated, "The fact remains that everyone who taps at a keyboard, opening a spreadsheet or a word-processing program, is working on an incarnation of a Turing machine."

A blue plaque was unveiled at King's College, Cambridge on the centenary of his birth on 23 June 2012 and is now installed at the college's Keynes Building on King's Parade.

On 25 March 2021, the Bank of England publicly unveiled the design for a new £50 note, featuring Turing's portrait, before its official issue on 23 June, Turing's birthday. Turing was selected as the new face of the note in 2019 following a public nomination process.

Centenary celebrations

To mark the 100th anniversary of Turing's birth, the Turing Centenary Advisory Committee (TCAC) co-ordinated the Alan Turing Year in 2012, a year-long programme of events around the world honouring Turing's life and achievements. The TCAC, chaired by S. Barry Cooper with Turing's nephew Sir John Dermot Turing acting as Honorary President, worked with the University of Manchester faculty members and a broad spectrum of people from Cambridge University and Bletchley Park.

Notes and references

Notes

References

Sources

 
 
 
 
 
 
 
 
 
 
 
 
 
 
 
 
 
  in 
 
 
 
 
 
 
 
 
 
 
 
 
 
 
 
 
  and 
  Turing's mother, who survived him by many years, wrote this 157-page biography of her son, glorifying his life. It was published in 1959, and so could not cover his war work. Scarcely 300 copies were sold (Sara Turing to Lyn Newman, 1967, Library of St John's College, Cambridge). The six-page foreword by Lyn Irvine includes reminiscences and is more frequently quoted. It was re-published by Cambridge University Press in 2012, to honour the centenary of his birth, and included a new foreword by Martin Davis, as well as a never-before-published memoir by Turing's older brother John F. Turing.
  This 1986 Hugh Whitemore play tells the story of Turing's life and death. In the original West End and Broadway runs, Derek Jacobi played Turing and he recreated the role in a 1997 television film based on the play made jointly by the BBC and WGBH, Boston. The play is published by Amber Lane Press, Oxford, ASIN: B000B7TM0Q

Further reading

Articles

Books
 
 
 
 
  (originally published in 1983); basis of the film The Imitation Game
  (originally published in 1959 by W. Heffer & Sons, Ltd)

External links

 Oral history interview with Nicholas C. Metropolis, Charles Babbage Institute, University of Minnesota. Metropolis was the first director of computing services at Los Alamos National Laboratory; topics include the relationship between Turing and John von Neumann
 How Alan Turing Cracked The Enigma Code Imperial War Museums
 Alan Turing Year 
 CiE 2012: Turing Centenary Conference
 Science in the Making Alan Turing's papers in the Royal Society's archives
 Alan Turing site maintained by Andrew Hodges including a short biography
 AlanTuring.net – Turing Archive for the History of Computing by Jack Copeland
 The Turing Archive – contains scans of some unpublished documents and material from the King's College, Cambridge archive
 Alan Turing Papers – University of Manchester Library, Manchester
 
 Sherborne School Archives – holds papers relating to Turing's time at Sherborne School
 Alan Turing plaques recorded on openplaques.org
 Alan Turing archive on New Scientist

 
1912 births
1954 suicides
20th-century English mathematicians
20th-century atheists
20th-century English philosophers
Academics of the University of Manchester
Academics of the University of Manchester Institute of Science and Technology
Alumni of King's College, Cambridge
Artificial intelligence researchers
Bayesian statisticians
Bletchley Park people
British anti-fascists
British cryptographers
British people of World War II
Computability theorists
Computer designers
English atheists
English computer scientists
English inventors
English logicians
English male long-distance runners
English people of Irish descent
English people of Scottish descent
Fellows of King's College, Cambridge
Fellows of the Royal Society
Former Protestants
Foreign Office personnel of World War II
Gay academics
Gay scientists
Gay sportsmen
GCHQ people
History of computing in the United Kingdom
LGBT-related suicides
LGBT mathematicians
LGBT philosophers
British LGBT scientists
English LGBT sportspeople
LGBT track and field athletes
Officers of the Order of the British Empire
People educated at Sherborne School
People from Maida Vale
People from Wilmslow
People convicted for homosexuality in the United Kingdom
People who have received posthumous pardons
Princeton University alumni
Recipients of British royal pardons
Theoretical biologists
Theoretical computer scientists
Deaths by cyanide poisoning
Suicides by cyanide poisoning
Suicides in England